Allison Cooper (born August 4, 1966) is an American former professional tennis player.

Cooper, a California native, played college tennis for the UCLA Bruins and won the 1988 NCAA Division I Women's Doubles Championship, partnering Stella Sampras. She and Sampras subsequently received entry into the doubles main draw at the 1988 US Open, where they came up against Louise Allen and Anna-Maria Fernandez for their first round match, which they lost in a third set tiebreak.

ITF finals

Singles: 1 (1–0)

Doubles: 5 (1–4)

References

External links
 
 

1966 births
Living people
American female tennis players
UCLA Bruins women's tennis players
Tennis people from California
21st-century American women